Charles Burney (1726–1814) was an English music historian.

Charles Burney may also refer to:
Charles Burney (Archdeacon of Colchester) (1786–1864), Anglican priest, father of the below
Charles Burney (Archdeacon of Kingston) (died 1907), Anglican priest, son of the above
Charles Burney (schoolmaster) (1757–1817), English classical scholar, schoolmaster and priest
Charles Fox Burney (1868–1925), Biblical scholar at Oxford University, England
Charles O. Burney Jr. (1907–1972), New York politician
Dennistoun Burney (Sir Charles Dennistoun Burney, 2nd Baronet, 1888–1968), English aeronautical engineer, private inventor and Conservative Party politician
Charles A. Burney (born 1930), British archaeologist

See also
Charles McBurney (disambiguation)
Burney (disambiguation)